Calospatha is an extremely rare, monotypic genus of flowering plant in the palm family found in peninsular Malaysia, where it is referred to as rotan demuk. It is not common in collections, nor has it been found in the wild for several years, leading some to conclude that the species may have become extinct. While not specialized for the task, these dioecious palms are noted for their climbing habit. The genus name is a combination of two Greek words meaning 'beautiful' and 'spathe'.

Description
Calospatha plants are solitary-trunked and covered in leaf scars, which exude a yellow gum after leaf loss. The linear leaflets are pinnately arranged and once-folded with toothed margins. The petioles and rachises feature recurved spines which hook onto vegetation and assist them in climbing. The inflorescences in both species consist of close, overlapping bracts from which male or female flowers emerge. The bracts are armed with spines and the inflorescence resembles those in Heliconia species. The small, round fruit, regarded as a delicacy by the Temuan aborigines, are scaly and usually contain three seeds.

References

External links
Calospatha on NPGS/GRIN
GBIF record and map
Fairchild Guide to Palms: Calospatha

Calamoideae
Endemic flora of Peninsular Malaysia
Trees of Peninsular Malaysia
Monotypic Arecaceae genera
Taxa named by Odoardo Beccari
Dioecious plants